Steven Eric Gordon (born March 23, 1960) is an American film director, character designer and animator, who is perhaps most well known for his work with animation film director Ralph Bakshi and on X-Men: Evolution.

Gordon was one of the directors on the first Marvel/Lionsgate direct-to-video Ultimate Avengers as well as the character designer for that DTV as well as the sequel. He was one of the directors for the TV series Wolverine and the X-Men. He directed the direct-to-DVD film Stan Lee presents: The Condor featuring Wilmer Valderrama. He was an uncredited storyboard artist on the feature film Terminator Salvation and is a director on the second (yet un-aired) animated TV show The Avengers for Marvel and Starz. In 2009, he co-directed the direct-to-video sequel to Happily N'ever After at Vanguard Animation alongside Boyd Kirkland. It was called Happily N'ever After 2: Snow White Another Bite @ The Apple and it turned out to be a very lucrative seller on DVD. Over one million copies of the film were sold on DVD worldwide. Currently he is Supervising Director on Voltron Force airing on NickToons for Kickstart and WEP Productions. He was also one of the directors for Pigs Next Door, an un-aired animated series produced by Saban Productions featuring the voices of John Goodman and Jaime Lee Curtis.

He started in animation working on Ralph Bakshi's animated feature Lord of the Rings as a "roto-photo" artist while still in High School. He quickly moved up to work as an assistant animator and eventually animated (roto-scoped) several scenes and was given animator credit on the finished film. He worked for Ralph Bakshi on and off for years on many Bakshi films including American Pop and Fire and Ice (as animation director and character designer) working alongside Frank Frazetta and Cool World (as Key Animator on Holli and Lonette).

He was the animation director, storyboard artist, key animator and character designer on The Swan Princess. He also worked on Space Jam: A New Legacy. In addition, he worked on Tom and Jerry: The Movie and with the company of Don Bluth on "Anastasia" and "Titan A.E." .

Currently illustrates a webcomic based on The Eternal Savage, available on the website of Edgar Rice Burroughs, Inc.  In February 2013, Sequential Pulp Comics, a graphic novel imprint distributed by Dark Horse Comics has announced that Gordon was one of the illustrators of Jungle Tales of Tarzan, written by Martin Powell.

Filmography

References

External links

Animators from California
American film directors
1960 births
Living people
Place of birth missing (living people)
American comics artists
American television directors
American animated film directors
American storyboard artists